The Collins English Dictionary is a printed and online dictionary of English. It is published by HarperCollins in Glasgow.

Editions
The current printed edition is the 13th edition, which was published in November 2018 and has 723,000 words, meanings and phrases – making it the largest single-volume English dictionary in print as of January 2023. The dictionary uses language research based on the Collins Corpus, which is continually updated and has over 4.5 billion words. The previous edition was the 12th edition, which was published in October 2014. A special "30th Anniversary" 10th edition was published in 2010, with earlier editions published once every 3–4 years.

History
The edition of the dictionary in 1979 with Patrick Hanks as editor and Laurence Urdang as editorial director, was the first British English dictionary to be typeset from the output from a computer database in a specified format. This meant that every aspect of an entry was handled by a different editor using different forms or templates. Once all the entries for an entry had been assembled, they were passed on to be keyed into the slowly assembled dictionary database which was completed for the typesetting of the first edition.  

In a later edition, they increasingly used the Bank of English established by John McHardy Sinclair at COBUILD to provide typical citations rather than examples composed by the lexicographer.

CollinsDictionary.com
The unabridged Collins English Dictionary was published on the web on 31 December 2011 on CollinsDictionary.com, along with the unabridged dictionaries of French, German, Spanish and Italian. The site also includes example sentences showing word usage from the Collins Bank of English Corpus, word frequencies and trends from the Google Ngrams project, and word images from Flickr.

In August 2012, CollinsDictionary.com introduced crowd-sourcing for neologisms, whilst still maintaining overall editorial control to remain distinct from Wiktionary and Urban Dictionary. This followed an earlier launch of a discussion forum for neologisms in 2004.

In May 2015, CollinsDictionary.com added 6,500 new Scrabble words to their Collins Official Scrabble Wordlist. The words are based on terms related to and influenced by slang, social media, food, technology, and more.

References

External links
CollinsDictionary.com – Collins English Dictionary, American English Dictionary, Thesaurus .

Online English dictionaries
William Collins, Sons books
1979 non-fiction books